The 2013 Mongolian Premier League also known as Niislel Lig or Capital League is the 46th edition of the tournament. The number of teams reduce to seven due to the withdrawal of Ulaanbaataryn Mazaalaynuud in the 2012 season. It started on 1 May and ended on 31 August 2013. Erchim won the tournament for the eighth time by beating Khangarid 4–1 in penalties. Erchim will also advance to the 2014 AFC President's Cup representing Mongolia.

League table

Results

First round

Final stages

Fourth place playoff match

Semifinals

1st Leg

2nd Leg

1st Leg

2nd Leg

Third place playoff match

Final

References

Mongolia Premier League seasons
Mongolia
Mongolia
football